Eternal Darkness: Sanity's Requiem is an action-adventure video game developed by Silicon Knights and published by Nintendo. Originally planned for the Nintendo 64, it was switched to the GameCube for development and released on June 24, 2002. It is the first M-rated game published by Nintendo as well as their first  game released after Satoru Iwata became President of Nintendo. While the game features similar gameplay mechanics to that of Resident Evil, it distinguishes itself with unique features, such as "sanity effects". In the game, players take on the role of several characters as they battle a powerful entity who seeks to enslave humanity.

Eternal Darkness was widely praised by reviewers and won numerous awards but was not a commercial success. A direct follow-up to the game was cancelled by Nintendo, who was the publisher and owned the game's copyright and trademark, and Silicon Knights a decade later went bankrupt and disbanded. Attempts by the game's writer and director Denis Dyack to make a spiritual successor entitled Shadow of the Eternals failed both of their Kickstarter campaigns, leading to the project being placed on indefinite hold. In the years since Eternal Darkness release, it has been regarded as one of the greatest games of all time, as well as one of the best horror games ever made.

Gameplay
The game is conducted from a third-person perspective. While the gameplay operates similar to Resident Evil fighting monsters and solving puzzles to further explore a location Eternal Darkness maintains notable differences in gameplay style, some of which distinguished it from other survival horror games of its time. An in-game map tracks a player's bearings. The inventory system stores weapons and items that can be used to solve puzzles, some of which can be combined with other objects, even enchanted with magick, for different effects.

Combat focuses on a simple targeting system. Players may attack in a general direction, or lock-on to an enemy to focus on individual parts of its anatomy. Decapitating most enemies effectively blinds them. There are many classes of enemies the player must either defeat or avoid. Each class also comes in a few varieties, and subtle differences between each variety exist as well, having slightly different appearances and traits. Some of the more common enemies vary very little in appearance, usually only changing in hue and aesthetics, but may have some behavioral differences. Boss and mini-boss enemies, however, tend to vary quite significantly.

The narrative of the game's story switches between two phases. The main phase focuses on a series of chapters in which players take control of a new character each time. The other phase acts as an intermission, exploring the mansion in order to find chapter pages and other items in order to progress. The game boasts twelve playable characters, split between four distinct locations, and from different periods of time, at times in anachronic order. Each of these characters are different in terms of the game's three main parameters health, sanity, and magick and have access to a small selection of weapons that they can use in combat, though what they can use is determined by the time period that they lived in. For example, characters from the more ancient eras are restricted to mostly melee weapons such as swords, with the occasional crossbow or throwable. Meanwhile, characters from the colonial era onwards have more access to ranged weapons, including modern-day firearms.

The story features multiple paths that can be taken at the end of the first chapter. This choice not only determines which of the game's other three antagonists are aligned to the plot, but it also has subtle effects on the gameplay in chapters and intermission periods. Some changes include slight differences in puzzles and items, but most changes revolve around enemy placement, which will determine how the player engages them. This can even have an effect on the relative difficulty of the game in certain situations. Red tinted enemies for example, are generally tougher, having more health and dealing more damage, making that story path a kind of unofficial hard mode. After the game is completed down one path, it becomes unavailable in future playthroughs, until the player completes all three paths.

Magick can be used by most characters and consists of spells that can be used to damage opponents, protect characters and heal them, and be used to solve certain puzzles. The player is also able to assign spells to buttons for quick-use during the game. After discovering a spell it can be used in subsequent chapters and intermission periods. All spells are fundamentally affected by what alignment rune is used to power them. The game incorporates four types Red, Green, Blue, and Purple. Each alignment affects spells on a specific parameter. On top of that, they operate on a rock-paper-scissors principle of gameplay. All spells require the player to combine a series of Runes together in order to cast them. Runes can be freely experimented with by the player. This robust mechanic of experimentation has been praised by game critics as unique, and something that sets the magick system in this apart from most magic systems of most other game titles.

The other distinctive gameplay aspect comes from "Sanity Effects", the game's standout concept that Nintendo patented. Upon beginning the game's second chapter, players must keep watch on a Sanity meter a green bar which decreases when the player is spotted by an enemy. As the bar becomes low, subtle changes to the environment and random unusual events begin to occur, which reflect the character's slackening grip on reality.

Minor effects include a variety of things, such as a skewed camera angle, heads of statues following the character, and unsettling noises. Stronger effects include bleeding on walls and ceilings, entering a room that is unrealistic before finding that the character never left the previous room, or the character suddenly dying. Fourth wall breaking effects such as "To Be Continued" promotions for a "sequel", and simulated errors and anomalies of the TV or GameCube can happen either from low or depleted sanity, or by a scripted event. While the latter does not affect gameplay, they can be misconstrued by the player as being actual technical malfunctions.

Story

Setting
The story of Eternal Darkness takes place over four principal locations which the game skips back and forth between. They include an underground temple complex called the Forbidden City, in Persia; a Khmer temple in Angkor Thom, Cambodia; Oublié Cathedral in Amiens, France; and the Roivas Family Estate in Rhode Island, which leads to an ancient underground city named Ehn'gha beneath the mansion. Each time a location is visited, it is done so in a different time period, spanning from 26 BC to 2000 AD. Each different era and character offers a different periodic and personal perspective on the location.

Plot

The chapters found in the game are not discovered in chronological order. Instead, to make the narrative more dramatic, each chapter jumps around the timeline of the plot. However, despite the overall story skipping back and forth through time, the chapters do follow chronological order within their respective locations. This is because each setting also has its own contained story. 

In 2000 AD, Alexandra Roivas finds herself returning to her family's estate in Rhode Island after her grandfather, Edward Roivas, her only living relative, is found brutally murdered. Two weeks after returning, the local police have gotten nowhere with the investigation, Alex decides to investigate the mansion for clues, and stumbles upon a secret room containing a book bound with human skin called the Tome of Eternal Darkness. Deciding to read it, she finds it contains accounts of various people in the past, beginning with the story of Pious Augustus in 26 BC.

Pious, a respected Roman military commander, is sent to Ancient Persia to locate an important relic. Lured away from his men by mysterious voices, Pious ventures into an underground temple complex called the Forbidden City. He comes across three artifacts. Each possesses the essence of powerful godlike beings referred to as "The Ancients": Chattur'gha, Xel'lotath and Ulyaoth. Upon attempting to touch one of the artifacts, Pious finds himself corrupted by its power, resulting in him becoming undead yet gaining a significant amount of power, whereupon he pledges his allegiance to the artifact's Ancient and begins working on summoning them into the universe. The remaining two artifacts that Pious did not claim were put out of Pious' reach. One of the other artifacts represents the Ancient that is stronger than Pious', and the other represents the Ancient weaker than Pious'.

The artifact representing the weaker Ancient remained in the Forbidden City. In 565 AD, a young swordsman named Karim, ventures to the Forbidden City to locate a treasure for a woman that he loves. Upon finding it, he sacrifices himself in order to guard it. Pious returns to Persia in the Middle Ages to construct a Pillar of Flesh at the Forbidden City, as part of his master's plans. In 1460 AD Roberto Bianchi, a Venetian architect traveling through the region, is captured by Pious under the guise of a warlord. While under involuntary servitude, he encounters the spirit of Karim, who entrusts him with the artifact in his possession. Roberto attempts to warn Pious of the dangers within but is thrown into the tower, becoming part of its foundation along with many others. Centuries later in 1991 AD, a Canadian firefighter named Michael Edwards works with his team to extinguish several major oil fires in the Middle East, following the end of the Gulf War. After an explosion killed his entire team and trapped him in the Forbidden City, he is approached by Roberto's spirit, who gives him the artifact and instructs him to take it to the Roivas Family Estate. Michael then moves to destroy the Forbidden City with a magickally enhanced bomb. A few months later, Michael delivers the artifact to Edward Roivas in secret, telling him that he "won't last a night".

The artifact representing the stronger Ancient is moved, by Pious, to Oublié Cathedral, in Amiens, France, in order to prevent it from being used against him. First, though, Pious orders the assassination of Charlemagne, so his movement cannot impede his plans. In 814 AD, a Frankish messenger named Anthony, who stumbles upon the plot, travels to the then small monastery in order to warn him of the danger to his life. Despite Anthony's best efforts, he arrives too late to save him and dies from the spell he was afflicted with. When the location is reconstructed into a Cathedral long afterwards, Pious summons a creature called the Black Guardian, to protect the artifact that could defeat his master. In 1485 AD a Franciscan monk named Paul Luther, visiting the region to view a holy relic at the cathedral, finds himself accused of murdering a fellow monk by the local Inquisition. Attempting to clear his name, he encounters the Black Guardian, which promptly kills him. In 1916 AD, During World War I, Oublié Cathedral is converted into a field hospital. Peter Jacob, a field reporter making accounts about the war, notes that patients have been disappearing of late. Venturing into the catacombs, he encounters the Black Guardian and defeats it, recovering the artifact it was guarding. Decades later, Edward is visited by a now elderly Peter who gives an account of his experience in Amiens before handing over the artifact in his possession.

While the other two artifacts are fought over between Pious and several unwitting souls, the "Corpse God" Mantorok, another powerful Ancient that can oppose Pious' master, has an artifact of its own. In 1150 AD, Pious travels to a temple in Angkor Thom, Cambodia in order to deal with Mantorok. A young Khmer slave girl, named Ellia, finds herself trapped within the temple at the same time. While trying to find her way out, she is approached by one of Mantorok's servants, who entrusts her with the task of protecting the Ancient's essence within her body. Pious kills her shortly after. Centuries later in 1983 AD, Dr. Edwin Lindsey, a noted archaeologist, ventures to Cambodia on an expedition to explore the temple. After nearly being killed by Pious, who disguised himself in order to accompany him, Edwin finds Ellia's body and is entrusted by her spirit with Mantorok's essence, which he eventually delivers to Edward a few weeks later.

Alongside the struggle to claim the powerful artifacts of the Ancients, the Roivas Family Estate in Rhode Island, U.S. holds secrets of its own. In 1760 AD, Dr. Maximillian Roivas, a colonial ancestor of Alex and her grandfather, inherits his father's mansion in Rhode Island and decides to investigate its secrets. He soon finds a large cavern beneath the mansion, containing an ancient city within called Ehn'gha. He returns to the surface to get help, only to be considered delirious, and is sent to an asylum for the rest of his life. In 1952 AD, Dr. Edward Roivas, a clinical psychologist at the time, inherits the Estate. Finding his way underground, Edward discovers the city incorporates magick machinery and uses it to greatly damage the city with a powerful destructive spell. Knowing this is not enough, he decides to research what he can within the Tome for the final battle. After decades, however, Edward is violently murdered by one of Ehn'gha's "Guardians".

Alex, having learned all she can from the Tome, decides to finish the fight. Recovering the artifacts from within the mansion, she soon ventures into Ehn'gha and uses them with the city's machinery, in order to summon a rival Ancient to fight Pious' master. Alex then engages Pious in combat, aided by the spirits of those written in the Tome, eventually defeating him and destroying the essence of his master, who is defeated by its rival. Edward's spirit then acts quickly to use Ehn'gha's mechanism to send back the summoned Ancient before it can cause any harm to the world.

After completing all three story paths, Edward Roivas narrates a revelation; all three paths are revealed to have occurred simultaneously in separate timelines. One of Mantorok's spheres of influence happens to be chaos, and with it, the ability to subtly manipulate time and space. It turned the other three Ancients against one another in mutual annihilation and merged the timestreams into one complete victory. Now only Mantorok remains, slowly dying.

Development
When Silicon Knights began work on Eternal Darkness, their intention was to create a game "that was in the horror genre, but not categorized as survival/horror", with then later labeling it as a "psychological thriller" during an early interview with IGN, as opposed to, what they referred to as, the "B-movie horror plots" of Resident Evil. At the same time, Denis Dyack remarked during an interview about his decision to design the game with the intention of "messing with people's heads", after being inspired by media reports. The game was initially planned for the Nintendo 64 and to feature several characters, including "a Special Forces commando deep behind enemy lines", with the developers showing off the early builds during the 1999 E3 Expo; Silicon Knights later changed their mind and rebuilt the game in order to make it a launch title for the Nintendo GameCube. It never made it as a launch title, as development was delayed.

The game was written by Denis Dyack and Ken McCulloch. The music and sound effects of Eternal Darkness were composed by Steve Henifin. The soundtrack was made exclusively available through Nintendo Power magazine, with the disc containing 14 tracks from the game, many of which are extended versions of those heard in the game. The game features voice-overs from several actors, some of whom are most notable for providing the voices of characters in the Metal Gear and Legacy of Kain series, and include:

Michael Bell 
Earl Boen 
Cam Clarke 
Neil Dickson 
Richard Doyle 
Greg Eagles 
Paul Eiding 
Kim Mai Guest 
Jennifer Hale 
David Hayter
William Hootkins 
Philip Proctor 
Rino Romano 
Neil Ross
Paula Tiso

Cut characters

Joseph De Molay, named for Jacques de Molay of the real Knights Templar, appeared in numerous demonstration versions seen during development of the game, and was playable for visitors to the 2001 E3 demo. There is material showing Joseph in both the Forbidden City and Oublié Cathedral. The game's launch was delayed in 2001, as the developers were forced to change the Arab world setting in a quarter of the game's levels. Writers Dyack and Ken McCulloch were forced to drop the use of Joseph De Molay within these levels, following the events of 9/11, as it was believed that his character and setting would have created the potential for controversy for referencing the Crusades so soon after a major terrorist attack. They instead created Karim, a whole new character unrelated to the Crusades, for the new setting of the levels. 

In addition to these changes, the developers also decided to ditch the use of a fifth Ancient in the story, but retained elements of the fifth alignment for use in the finished game. The fifth alignment's primary color designation was yellow. In-game, yellow appears on unaligned runes and disintegrating enemies. Though the Ancient itself was excluded, its role in the story was repurposed and added onto Mantorok's, which is why Mantorok plays both a superior and inferior role to the other three Ancients, implying that the unnamed yellow Ancient was going to fulfill one of those two.

Release
Eternal Darkness: Sanity's Requiem was first released and published by Nintendo on June 24, 2002, in North America, October 25 in Japan and November 1 in Europe. It was the first video game published directly by Nintendo, rather than a third-party developer, to be rated M (Mature) by the Entertainment Software Rating Board.

Short films
In 2002, Nintendo and Hypnotic, a film entertainment company, established a filmmaking contest in which contestants submitted ideas that would be later funded into short films if selected. Hypnotic also purchased the rights to produce a film or TV series based on the IP.

The contest drew over 500 submissions. Ten finalists were selected and were granted $2,000 each to produce their respective short films. The grand prize for the contest was $20,000, and was selected by a panel of industry experts. The finalists were unveiled between May 23 and July 4, 2002.

The grand prize winner of the contest was Patrick Daughters, for the film Unloved. The viewer's choice award went to the film Cutting Room Floor by Tyler Spangler and Michael Cioni.

Reception

Reviews and sales

Eternal Darkness: Sanity's Requiem received a near-universal critical acclaim upon its release, with aggregated review scores of over 9/10 at both GameRankings and Metacritic. Upon review, IGN gave Eternal Darkness one of its Editor's Choice Awards and, in its review of the game, stated: "Simply put, an amazing achievement that shouldn't be overlooked. Games do not come any better than this".

Eternal Darkness sold less than half a million copies worldwide. In Japan, the game has sold 17,748 copies as of December 31, 2006. In Canada, the game sold 20,000 copies.

Awards
Eternal Darkness: Sanity's Requiem won many awards, including the "Outstanding Achievement in Character or Story Development" award at the 6th Annual Interactive Achievement Awards presented by the Academy of Interactive Arts & Sciences in 2003, where it was also nominated for "Console Game of the Year", "Innovation in Console Gaming", and "Outstanding Achievement in Art Direction". GameSpot named it the best video game of June 2002. At GameSpot's Best and Worst of 2002, it was awarded "Best Sound on GameCube", "Best Story on GameCube", and "Best Graphics (Artistic) on GameCube"; the game was also nominated for "Best Music on GameCube", "Best Action Adventure Game on GameCube", and "Game of the Year on GameCube". GameSpy's Game of the Year Awards gave it their honorary "Day of the Tentacle (Cthulhu) Award".

Retrospective
In 2006, Nintendo Power ranked Eternal Darkness as the 101st top game on Nintendo systems, while the readers of IGN had it voted as the 96th best video game of all time on all systems; in 2009, Official Nintendo Magazine had it listed as the 48th best Nintendo game. The game was ranked as the seventh best game for the GameCube by X-Play in 2006, as the fifth best GameCube game by IGN in 2007, as the tenth best GameCube game by ScrewAttack that same year, and placed fourth on the list of top GameCube games in the January 2009 issue of Game Informer.

Both X-Play and Game Informer in 2007 in 2006 ranked it as the fifth scariest game of all time. In other lists, ScrewAttack ranked the fake "Corrupt Data" sanity effect as the ninth top "OMGWTF" moment in gaming in 2008, while Alex Roivas was included among the 50 greatest heroines in video games by Tom's Games in 2007 and ranked as the 40th greatest heroine in video game history by Complex in 2013.

Several retrospective articles demanded a follow-up game. IGN included Eternal Darkness on their 2008 list of "horror franchises that should rise from the grave", GamesRadar included Eternal Darkness among the games "with untapped franchise potential" in 2009, and UGO included it on a similar list of games "that need sequels" in 2010.

Legacy
Alex Roivas makes a cameo appearance in the 2018 fighting game Super Smash Bros. Ultimate as one of the many "Spirits" that players can collect. The battle associated with Alex's Spirit sees the player needing to defeat Zero Suit Samus from the Metroid series as the screen is mirrored at random intervals.

Cancelled sequel
Denis Dyack, designer of Eternal Darkness: Sanity's Requiem and Too Human, said "absolutely yes" in July 2006 regarding the question of a possible sequel. He stated that Silicon Knights had intended for Eternal Darkness to be a stand-alone game, but the company has always intended to make more games set in the Eternal Darkness universe involving the Ancients. At Microsoft's Spring 2008 Showcase, Dyack confirmed that a return to the Eternal Darkness brand could be on the cards: "There is a chance; we love all the games we work on. We don't want to be pigeon-holed [into a genre], we want to be known for strong content...There's a strong chance we'll return to it, but there's no announcements yet". In November 2011, Silicon Knights claimed they wanted to focus on one of their most requested titles for the next generation of consoles. This combined with the fact that Nintendo had trademarked the title once again, spawned rumours that another Eternal Darkness game would be made as a launch title for the Nintendo's Wii U console. However, the project was cancelled due to Silicon Knights' legal troubles with Epic Games.

In December 2012, Nintendo extended their ownership on the Eternal Darkness trademark for the fifth time, indicating that the company still had interest in the property. Any chances for a sequel, at least under Silicon Knights, were terminated on May 9, 2013, after Silicon Knights filed for bankruptcy, closed its office, and sold off its equipment. Nevertheless, Nintendo reregistered its trademark later on July 29 with a new document that indicated that it might be a downloadable game. When asked about this by GameSpot, Nintendo declined to answer. In the summer of 2020, after years of neglect and with no word of any plans for future installments, the game's trademark was declared "abandoned" by the U.S. Patent and Trademark Office; soon after Nintendo has renewed the game's trademark as of July 31, 2020, with the mention of "video game cartridges", differing from previous trademarks.

Shadow of the Eternals
In May 2013, Precursor Games, staffed by many former Silicon Knights members, had begun a crowdfunding campaign through PayPal, seeking $1.5 million to create a spiritual successor to Eternal Darkness under the title Shadow of the Eternals, to be released for Microsoft Windows and Wii U. The game was to be released in 12 two- to four-hour long episodes, with Denis Dyack acting as the game's chief creative officer. On May 13, a secondary fund-raising campaign was launched on Kickstarter, aiming to receive $1.35 million within 36 days. Eventually, being only halfway through their funding campaign in early June, as a result of "a host of a new exciting opportunities that will make the game better than [Precursor Games] envisioned", the company decided to shut down both funding campaigns on Kickstarter and their official website whilst refunding all the accumulated money back to their contributors, and promised to relaunch a new campaign a few weeks later with "a reveal of these exciting new developments". Later in June, Precursor's founding member, and co-designer of both Eternal Darkness and Shadow of the Eternals, Kenneth McCulloch was arrested and pleaded guilty on charges of child pornography; the studio immediately severed all ties with him. Another Kickstarter campaign was launched on July 25 aiming for a $750,000 goal this time. Instead of 12 episodes, the game was intended to be released as one 8- to 10-hour experience.

The game was announced as follows: "When Detective Paul Becker is called to one of the bloodiest gang massacres in Louisiana state history, only two survivors remain from a brutal conflict between two rival cults. As Becker begins his interrogations of the suspects, their combined recollections will uncover the truth about the 'Eternals'. Featuring an ensemble cast of heroes and villains, Shadow of the Eternals will span over 2500 years of history throughout Egypt, England, Hungary, and the United States. Players will question the perception of reality as they try to balance the mechanics of combat, magick, and sanity events to progress through the adventure. Shadow of the Eternals will take players on a memorable journey throughout time; weaving historical fact with disturbing fiction to create an experience unlike any other". In creating the look of the game, Precursor Games purchased art assets from Silicon Knights which were going to be used on the Eternal Darkness sequel before it was canceled. Though Nintendo still owns the rights to Eternal Darkness as well as the patent for the game's unique "Sanity Meter", Precursor Games head Paul Caporicci stated that the studio were in "constant communication" with Nintendo, who are supportive of the project.

As of September 30, 2013, Shadow of the Eternals was delayed indefinitely due to lack of funding on Kickstarter. The Escapist commented: "What seemed like a fairly obvious slam-dunk sequel to a classic game has instead been a circus of multiple failed crowdfunding campaigns, child pornography, and outright lack of faith in the developers. It certainly must be a discouraging experience for everyone involved, but that's the double-edged blade of crowdfunding: the crowds occasionally [do] not want your game". Kyle Hilliard of Game Informer wrote: "Despite good intentions, and the excitement surrounding the prospect of a sequel to Eternal Darkness, Shadow of the Eternals has been plagued with issues since its original announcement. It's disappointing, but not too surprising that Precursor has decided to put the game on hold. I would still like to see the final game someday, but I am not confident that we will be seeing or even hearing from the game anytime soon".

In October 2014, Denis Dyack had created a new entertainment company Quantum Entanglement Entertainment. One of the company's first projects was to relaunch the development for Shadow of the Eternals. Dyack was also considering Shadow of the Eternals as a film and television property. In January 2018, QEE was quietly shut down and the production of Shadow of the Eternals was put on hold. Dyack renamed the company as Apocalypse Studios and announced a new free-to-play role-playing game for the PC titled Deadhaus Sonata.

References

External links

Eternal Darkness: Sanity's Requiem at MobyGames

2002 video games
Cancelled Nintendo 64 games
Censored video games
GameCube games
GameCube-only games
Gulf War video games
Impact of the September 11 attacks on the video game industry
Interactive Achievement Award winners
Nintendo games
Panhistorical video games
2000s horror video games
Silicon Knights games
Single-player video games
Crowdfunding projects
Video games about demons
Video games about ghosts
Video games about mental health
Video games about old age
Video games developed in Canada
Video games featuring female protagonists
Video games produced by Shigeru Miyamoto
Video games scored by Steve Henifin
Video games set in 1916
Video games set in 1952
Video games set in 1983
Video games set in 1991
Video games set in 2000
Video games set in Cambodia
Video games set in France
Video games set in Iran
Video games set in Rhode Island
Video games set in the 1st century BC
Video games set in the 6th century
Video games set in the 9th century
Video games set in the 12th century
Video games set in the 15th century
Video games set in the 18th century
Video games set in the Middle Ages
World War I video games